Petersfield Hospital is a health facility in Swan Street, Petersfield, Hampshire, England. It is managed by Southern Health NHS Foundation Trust.

History
The facility has its origins in the Petersfield Cottage Hospital which was established in Swan Street at the initiative of Dr. Albert Warren Leachman with five beds in April 1871. The hospital joined the National Health Service in 1948, but after it becoming dilapidated, it was replaced by a modern community hospital in 1992.

References

External links
Official site

Hospital buildings completed in 1992
1871 establishments in England
Hospitals established in 1871
Hospitals in Hampshire
NHS hospitals in England
Petersfield
Southern Health NHS Foundation Trust